Tracy Rose Chevalier  (born 19 October 1962) is an American-British novelist. She is best known for her second novel, Girl with a Pearl Earring, which was adapted as a 2003 film starring Scarlett Johansson and Colin Firth.

Personal background
Chevalier was born on 19 October 1962, in Washington, D.C. She is the daughter of Douglas and Helen (née Werner) Chevalier. Her father was a photographer who worked with The Washington Post for more than 30 years. Her mother died in 1970, when Chevalier was eight years old. Chevalier has an older sister, Kim Chevalier, who resides in Soulan, France; and a brother, Michael Chevalier, who lives in Salida, Colorado. , Chevalier lives in London with her husband, Jonathan Drori.

She graduated from Bethesda-Chevy Chase High School in Bethesda, Maryland, in 1980. After receiving her bachelor's degree in English from Oberlin College in 1984, she moved to England, where she began working in publishing. In 1993, she began studying Creative Writing, earning a master's degree from the University of East Anglia. Her tutors included novelists Malcolm Bradbury and Rose Tremain.

Professional background
Following her graduation from Oberlin College, Chevalier moved to England, where she began working as an editorial assistant with Macmillan's Dictionary of Art, then later joined St. James Press, serving as a reference book editor.

Her first novel, The Virgin Blue, was published in the UK in 1997 and was chosen by W H Smith for their showcase of new authors. Her second novel, entitled Girl with a Pearl Earring, was published in 1999. The work, which was based on the famous painting by Vermeer, has been translated into 38 languages. As of 2014, it has sold over five million copies worldwide.
It won the Barnes and Noble Discover Award in 2000. In 2003, a film based on the novel was released, receiving three Academy Award nominations in 2004, along with ten BAFTAs and two Golden Globes. Her 2013 novel, The Last Runaway was honored with the Ohioana Book Award and was chosen for the Richard and Judy Book Club for autumn 2013.

In 2011 she edited and contributed towards Why Willows Weep, a collection of short stories by 19 authors, the sale of which raised money for the Woodland Trust, for which her husband served as a trustee.

Other of her works that include historical figures as characters include.William Lobb and Johnny Appleseed in At the Edge of the Orchard, and William Blake in Burning Bright.

Memberships
Chevalier has been involved in representing authors as a member of various community organizations. In 2004, she began serving as the chairperson for the Management Committee for the UK's Society of Authors, serving in that capacity for four years. She served on the advisory board of the UK's Public Lending Right from 2008 until 2015, while as serving as Patron of World Book Night. Girl with a Pearl Earring was chosen as one of the books given away in both the US and UK for World Book Night 2013. In 2015 she joined the British Library Board as a Trustee. She is also an Ambassador for the Woodland Trust, where her husband serves as a member of the board of directors.

Honors and awards
 1997: WH Smith Fresh Talent for The Virgin Blue
 2000: Barnes and Noble Discover Award for Girl with a Pearl Earring
 2008: Fellow, Royal Society of Literature
 2013: Ohioana Book Award, for The Last Runaway
 2013: Richard and Judy Book Club book for The Last Runaway
 2013: Honorary Doctorate, Oberlin College and University of East Anglia

Works
 The Virgin Blue (1997) 
 Girl with a Pearl Earring (1999) 
 Falling Angels (2001) 
 The Lady and the Unicorn (2003) 
 Burning Bright (2007) 
 Remarkable Creatures (2009) 
 The Last Runaway (2013) 
 At the Edge of the Orchard (2016) 
 New Boy (2017) 
 A Single Thread (2019) 

As editor
 Twentieth-Century Children's Writers, 3rd edition, St. James Press, 1989, 
 Reader, I Married Him: Stories Inspired by Jane Eyre, 2016,

References

External links

 
 
 
 

1962 births
Living people
American historical novelists
British historical novelists
Fellows of the Royal Society of Literature
Bethesda-Chevy Chase High School alumni
Oberlin College alumni
Alumni of the University of East Anglia
American expatriates in England
Writers from Washington, D.C.
20th-century American novelists
21st-century American novelists
20th-century American women writers
American women novelists
21st-century American women writers
Women historical novelists